Marcel Planiol (23 September 1853 – 31 August 1931) was a French professor of law at the University of Rennes, then at the Sorbonne.
He wrote on the law and on historical Brittany.
He is known for his Elementary Treatise of Civil Law (1901), which attempted to explain French civil law in terms of elementary principles, particularly the maxims of Roman law.

Life

Marcel Planiol was born on 23 September 1853 in Nantes, Atlantique.
His parents were Amand Planiol and Julie Élisabeth Laporte.
He married in Rennes on 4 May 1885 to Madeleine Jeanne Claudel (1864–1947).
They had a son, "Maurice" Amand Jules Planiol (1886–1963).

Planiol studied at the Faculty of Law of Paris, and wrote his thesis on Droit romain : Des bénéfices accordés aux héritiers. Droit français : Du bénéfice d'inventaire in 1879.
He obtained his agrégation (teaching license) in 1880, and was accepted by the University of Grenoble as a teacher of civil law, Roman law and tax law.
He was elected to the University of Rennes in 1882, then to the Sorbonne in 1887, where he succeeded Charles Beudant.
Planiol was made a Professor at the Paris Faculty of Law.
He taught Roman law, inheritance, labour law, patent law and criminal law.

In 1899 Planiol began work on the Traité élémentaire de droit civil (Elementary Treatise of Civil Law), which would make his reputation.
His son died at the age of 20 during World War I (1914–18).
After the war Planiol gave up teaching.
Georges Ripert was called to Paris in 1919 as a substitute for Planiol.
Ripert was given responsibility for revisions to the Traité élémentaire de droit civil.
Later Planiol and Ripert co-authored the Traité pratique de droit civil (Practical Treatise on Civil Law).
Ripert undertook revision of this treatise, which became a work edited by Ripert but with several other authors.

Marcel Planiol died on 31 August 1931 in Paris at the age of 77.

Publications

Planiol wrote on law and also on Breton institutions.
He contributed to La Grande Encyclopédie of André Berthelot and wrote on public and private law in Brittany, a work that won an award from the Académie des Sciences Morales et Politiques.
The term "elementary" in the title of his major work, the Traité élémentaire de droit civil, refers to his attempt to return to the foundational elements of civil law, particularly those derived from Roman law, and to remove the additions of medieval Romanists.
The work explained French civil law in moral terms of fault, obligation and responsibility.
It returned to an organization by subject area rather than following the sequence of the Civil Code.
It illustrated the rules by real life examples, and promoted natural law, a small number of common sense maxims, which the legislator must accept.
The work was revised by Ripert, and was later rewritten by Ripert and Jean Boulanger.
Publications include:

Law

Brittany

Notes

Sources

1853 births
1931 deaths
French magistrates
French legal scholars